Sugar Creek is a  tributary of the Susquehanna River in Bradford County, Pennsylvania in the United States.

Sugar Creek joins the Susquehanna River near the borough of Towanda.

See also
List of rivers of Pennsylvania

References

Rivers of Pennsylvania
Tributaries of the Susquehanna River
Rivers of Bradford County, Pennsylvania